Prabhdeep Gill (born c. 1975) is a Canadian politician and a Member of the Legislative Assembly of Alberta. He was elected in the 2016 Calgary-Greenway by-election to replace Manmeet Bhullar, who had died in a car accident between Calgary and Edmonton.

Background 
Gill was a member of the Appeals Panel for Human Services Alberta, prior to being elected as a Member of the Legislative Assembly.

Political career 
Gill won the nomination for the PC candidate in the 2016 Calgary-Greenway byelection, after being first appointed by the party. The initial appointment drew controversy, as it appeared that the party establishment was preventing an open nomination process. As such, Gill's initial nomination was withdrawn by interim leader Ric McIver, though he won the nomination by election two days after. Gill was elected in the by-election with 27.73% of the popular vote, finishing four points ahead of Devinder Toor, the Wildrose Party candidate, and almost 8 points ahead of Roop Rai, the New Democrat candidate, whose party held a majority in the Legislature at that time. Gill's by-election win allowed the PCs to maintain their legislative caucus of 9 members.

Electoral history

2016 by-election

References 

Politicians from Calgary
Progressive Conservative Association of Alberta MLAs
Living people
Guru Nanak Dev University alumni
University of British Columbia alumni
21st-century Canadian politicians
Canadian politicians of Indian descent
United Conservative Party MLAs
Year of birth missing (living people)